Pierre-Luc Sleigher (born February 12, 1982) is a Canadian professional ice hockey player. He currently plays with the Schwenninger Wild Wings in the Deutsche Eishockey Liga (DEL).

He has also played for the Atlantic City Boardwalk Bullies, Rapperswil-Jona Lakers, San Diego Gulls, Toledo Storm, and  played the 2009-10 season with the Kassel Huskies.

External links

1982 births
Atlantic City Boardwalk Bullies players
Kassel Huskies players
Living people
EHC Olten players
SC Rapperswil-Jona Lakers players
San Diego Gulls (ECHL) players
Toledo Storm players
Victoriaville Tigres players
Canadian expatriate ice hockey players in Germany
Canadian expatriate ice hockey players in Switzerland
Canadian ice hockey centres